Azángaro Province is a province of the Puno Region in Peru.

Languages 
According to the 2007 census, Quechua was spoken by 81.0% of the population as their first language, while 18.4% spoke Spanish, 0.3% spoke Aymara, 0.0% spoke Asháninka, 0.1% spoke other indigenous languages and 0.0% spoke foreign languages.

Political division 
The province measures  and is divided into fifteen districts:

Geography 
Some of the highest mountains of the province are listed below:

See also 
 Hatun Mayu

References

External links 
  
 Municipalidad Provincial de Azangaro

Provinces of the Puno Region